The 1993 CAF Cup was the second football club tournament season that took place for the runners-up of each African country's domestic league. It was won by Stella Adjamé in two-legged final victory against Simba SC.

Preliminary round

|}

First round

|}

Second round

|}

Quarter-finals

|}

Semi-finals

|}

Final

|}

Winners

External links
CAF Cup 1993 - rsssf.com

3
CAF Cup